John P. Surma (born 1954 in Pittsburgh, Pennsylvania) is an American businessman. He was the executive chairman of the board of United States Steel Corporation. Surma retired as CEO of U.S. Steel effective September 1, 2013, and Chairman effective January 1, 2014, positions he held since 2004.

Biography
Surma received his bachelor's degree in accounting in 1976 from Pennsylvania State University, following which he joined Price Waterhouse, in 1987, he was admitted as a partner. In 1983 Surma was picked for Ronald Reagan’s Executive Exchange Program in Washington, D.C., where he worked with the Federal Reserve Board. He was appointed by Obama to serve as the vice chairman of the  President's Advisory Committee for Trade Policy and Negotiations

In 1997 he was hired at Marathon Oil, then a subsidiary of U.S. Steel, as the senior vice president for finance & accounting.  In 1998, he became president of  Speedway SuperAmerica, a subsidiary of Marathon, and in 2001 he became president of Marathon Ashland Petroleum, another subsidiary.  When U. S. Steel and Marathon separated at the end of 2001, he stayed with U. S. Steel as vice chairman and chief financial officer.  He became president of U. S. Steel in March 2003, and chairman of the board as of February 2006.

Among his current posts Surma is chairman of the International Iron and Steel Institute, vice chairman of the American Iron and Steel Institute and a member of the board of directors of the National Association of Manufacturers. As the vice chairman of the Board of Trustees of Pennsylvania State University, Surma informed longtime Penn State football coach Joe Paterno, by phone, that he had been terminated amid the media firestorm in the wake of the Penn State child sex abuse scandal.  Surma became chairman of the Penn State Board of Trustees three days later when Chairman Steve Garban resigned his position. In January 2012 he relinquished the position to The Bank of New York Mellon executive Karen Peetz, but he has continued to serve on the board. Surma served as a director of BNY Mellon until April 2012. In 2011 his reported compensation as a director of BNY Mellon was $216,575.

Surma is involved with education and community development in Pittsburgh.

Surma became an honorary member of the National Society of Black Engineers (NSBE) in 2006.

Surma received the American Iron and Steel Institute's Elbert Gary Medal in 2006.

Surma retired as chief executive officer of United States Steel on August 31, 2013. He continued to serve as executive chairman of the board of directors until December 31, 2013, when he retired from the company and the board.

In September 2015, John Surma assumed the chairmanship of the National Safety Council Board of Directors, succeeding Jeff Woodbury. Surma had been on the board since 2011.  He retired from that position in 2017, being succeeded by Mark Vergnano.

Compensation
While CEO of United States Steel in 2008, John P. Surma earned a total compensation of $11,130,689, which included a base salary of $1,218,336, a cash bonus of $3,250,000, stocks granted of $4,174,028, options granted of $2,233,336, and other compensation of $254,989.

In 2009, he requested a 20% salary reduction and more than 60% reduction in his compensation package citing the difficult business environment.  From June 6, 2008, to May 31, 2013, with Surma at the helm, US Steel's stock value plummeted by 89%.

Pittsburgh Penguins
Surma is a minority owner of the Pittsburgh Penguins of the National Hockey League with a share estimated in 2012 of $2 million.

Notes

References

See also
 List of chief executive officers
 Executive officer

1954 births
Living people
American chief executives of manufacturing companies
Baptists from Pennsylvania
Smeal College of Business alumni
Businesspeople from Pittsburgh
Pittsburgh Penguins owners
U.S. Steel people